Pentaphenylantimony is an organoantimony compound containing five phenyl groups attached to one antimony atom. It has formula Sb(C6H5)5 (or SbPh5).

Properties
The solid is colourless and melts at 169-170°C.

As a solid the pure form crystallises with a roughly square pyramidal shape. It can also form solvate complexes with cyclohexane or tetrahydrofuran—but not with diethyl ether—which form crystals with a trigonal bipyramid shape. When dissolved, molecules are also trigonal bipyramidal. However with nuclear magnetic resonance, in solution, the phenyl groups all appear to be equivalent. This is probably because the molecule is not stable in shape and orientation of phenyl changes rapidly.

Solid pure pentaphenylantimony forms triclinic crystals in the P space group. The unit cell has a=10.286 b=10.600 and c=13.594 Å, α=79.20° β=70.43° γ=119.52°. The basal Sb-C bond length is 2.216 Å whereas the apex Sb-C length is 2.115 Å.

Reactions
Pentaphenylantimony reacts with a variety of reagents that replace one or more phenyl groups with a different substituent. Reagents with acidic hydrogen give benzene as byproduct, whereas dihalogens (or synthons of them) give the analogous halobenzene as byproduct:
 Ph5Sb + HOR → PhH + Ph4SbOR
 Ph5Sb + HX → PhH + Ph4SbX
 Ph5Sb + X2 → PhX + Ph4SbX
For example, pentaphenylantimony reacts with dicarboxylic acids in solution, by substituting a phenyl group with the acid hydrogen. This yields a tetraphenyl antimony or bis(tetraphenyl antimony) compound.

When heated, pentaphenylantimony forms triphenylstibine, biphenyl and p-quaterphenyl.

Pentaphenylantimony reacts with bromine to make bromobenzene and tetraphenylstibonium bromide. With hydrogen bromide, tetraphenylstibonium bromide along with benzene is the result. Pentaphenylantimony reacts with methanol to make methoxytetraphenylantimony and dimethoxytriphenylantimony. A reaction with carbon tetrachloride yields tetraphenylstibonium chloride, chlorobenzene, and benzene. All these reactions appear to involve forming the phenyl radical.

Formation
Pentaphenylantimony can be formed by reacting dichlorotriphenylantimony with phenyl lithium.

References

Extra reading

Organoantimony compounds
Hypervalent molecules